Agrotis turbans is a moth of the family Noctuidae. It is found in Uzbekistan.

Agrotis
Moths described in 1888
Endemic fauna of Uzbekistan
Moths of Asia